Vengara is a town in Malappuram district of Kerala state. It is situated in the Vengara Grama Panchayat and is located in Tirurangadi Taluk.
Instagram|https://instagram.com/stories.of_vengara?igshid=YmMyMTA2M2Y=

Official status

Vengara is a "special grade" panchayath in Malappuram district and is situated in Tirurangadi Taluk. It was famous for its spice trading. The discovery of oil in the Gulf countries led to large scale migration of people to work in semi-skilled jobs. It has significant role in improving quality of life and bringing prosperity to this part of Kerala.

The town is a connecting point between kondotty-kottakal road and parappanangadi-malappuram road. 

In the recent delimitation of constituencies Vengara Assembly constituency was formed. Vengara is included in the Malappuram Loksabha constituency. Vengara is the headquarters of Vengara Block Panchayath. There is a sub-district with Vengara as headquarters in Malappuram educational district. Vengara is also home to a police station and a BSNL telephone exchange.

Tourist destinations 

 Mini Ooty
 Cheruppadimala
 Chittadi Kulam 
 Ekar Kulam

Education

Malabar College of Advanced Studies is a resourceful destination for higher studies in Vengara. Higher Secondary Schools  Govt Girls VHSS Vengara  and  KMHSS Kuttoor North are within the boundary of Vengara Panchayath.Govt.Boys VHSS Vengra situated in town. Tirurangadi PSMO College, Chemmad Darul Huda university, IUHSS Parappur etc. are within 7 km from Vengara.

Politics
Vengara Panchayath is ruled by the alliance of Indian Union Muslim League and Indian National Congress parties. Chakkeeri Ahemed Kutty(late) was from Vengara.

Vengara Panchayath includes 23 wards. Panchayath ruling council is presided by V K Kunhalan kutty (Muslim League).

Geography
Vengara is spread on the banks of Kadalundi River, the third-longest river in Malabar after Bharathappuzha and Chaliyar. Oorakam Mala is the highest nearby hill. Vengara is 5 km from Tirurangadi, 6 km from Chemmad a major town in the district and 15 km from Malappuram and Parappanangadi. Kottakkal is 8 km from Vengara. Other nearby towns are Manjeri (27 km) and Tirur (23 km).

People

The population is predominantly Muslims followed by Hindus, with few Christians. The major source of income is remittances from family members employed in Gulf countries. Other occupations include retail and agriculture.

Vengara people are all interested in Football. There are a number of football clubs like KASMA CLUB KOORIYAD, Famous arts and sports club ambalamadu, Vattathingal Vengara, Champions Vengara, MASC Parambilpadi, GASC Gandhikkunu, BASC Manatti, Town Team Vengara, Undas Kuttoor Kuzhichena, SHINE STAR PAKKADAPURAYA, AFC AREEKULAM three star arts and sports areekkapalliyali legends sports club areekkapalliyali

Panchayaths in Vengara Constituency
 Abdul Rahiman Nagar and Edarikode
 Vengara, Oorakam
 Kannamangalam and  Othukkungal
 Parappur and  Thennala

Culture

Transportation
The nearest airport is at Kozhikode.  The nearest major railway station is at Parappanangadi, Tanur.

References

Instagram

Cities and towns in Malappuram district
Parappanangadi area
Instagram account | https://instagram.com/stories.of_vengara?igshid=YmMyMTA2M2Y=